County Waterford was a constituency represented in the Irish House of Commons until 1800.

Members of Parliament
 1560 Thomas Power and Peter Aylwarde
 1585 Richard Aylwarde and James Sherlock
 1613–1615 Sir James Gough and John Power of Compyer
 1634–1635 James Walshe and John Power of Dowshill
 1639–1649 Sir Richard Osborne, 1st Baronet and John Power of Dowshill
 1661–1666 Richard Power of Curraghmore (succeeded to peerage, 1661 and replaced by James, Lord Annesley) and Sir Richard Osborne, 1st Baronet

1689–1801

Notes

References

Constituencies of the Parliament of Ireland (pre-1801)
Historic constituencies in County Waterford
1800 disestablishments in Ireland
Constituencies disestablished in 1800